Chepén Province is one of the twelve provinces that make up the La Libertad Region of Peru. It is bordered on the north by the Lambayeque Region, on the east by the Cajamarca Region, on the south by Pacasmayo Province, and on the west by the Pacific Ocean. The capital of the Chepén province is the city of Chepén.

Political division 

The province measures  and is divided into three districts.

Districts 
The province is divided into three districts, which are:
  

The population of the province is 71,954 by the Instituto Nacional de Estadística e Informática.

Some localities
Pacanguilla
Chérrepe
San José de Moro
Talambo

See also
La Libertad Region
Pacasmayo Province

References

External links 
 Provincial Municipality of Chepén

Provinces of the La Libertad Region